Title 40 is a part of the United States Code of Federal Regulations. Title 40 arranges mainly environmental regulations that were promulgated by the US Environmental Protection Agency (EPA), based on the provisions of United States laws (statutes of the U.S. Federal Code). Parts of the regulation may be updated annually on July 1.

Chapter I - Environmental Protection Agency
Subchapter A - General (Parts 1 - 29)
Subchapter B - Grants and Other Federal Assistance (Parts 30 - 49)
Subchapter C - Air Programs (Parts 50 - 97) (Clean Air Act)
National Ambient Air Quality Standards (NAAQS)
Criteria air contaminants
Requirements for Preparation, Adoption and Submittal of Implementation Plans
Approval and Promulgation of Implementation Plans
Ambient Air Monitoring Reference and Equivalent Methods
Prior Notice of Citizen Suits
Outer Continental Shelf Air Regulations
Regional Consistency
Primary Nonferrous Smelter Orders
Ambient Air Quality Surveillance
National Volatile Organic Compound Emission Standards for Consumer and Commercial Products
Standards of Performance for New Stationary Sources (NSPS)
National Emissions Standards for Hazardous Air Pollutants (NESHAP)
Approval and Promulgation of State Plans for Designated Facilities and Pollutants
Compliance Assurance Monitoring
Consolidated Federal Air Rule
Assessment and Collection of Noncompliance Penalties by EPA
EPA Approval of State Noncompliance Penalty Program
Chemical Accident Prevention Provisions
Special Exemptions From Requirements of the Clean Air Act
State Operating Permit Programs
Federal Operating Permit Programs
Permits Regulation
Sulfur Dioxide Allowance System
Sulfur Dioxide Opt-Ins
Continuous Emission Monitoring
Acid Rain Nitrogen Oxides Emission Reduction Program
Excess Emissions
Appeal Procedures
Registration of Fuels and Fuel Additives
Regulation of Fuels and Fuel Additives
Designation Of Areas for Air Quality Planning Purposes
Protection of Stratospheric Ozone
Significant New Alternatives Policy (SNAP)
Control of Air Pollution From Mobile Sources
Control of Emissions From New and In-Use Highway Vehicles and Engines
Control of Air Pollution From Aircraft and Aircraft Engines
Clean-Fuel Vehicles
Control of Emissions From New and In-Use Nonroad Compression-Ignition Engines
Control of Emissions From Nonroad Spark-Ignition Engines at or Below 19 Kilowatts
Control of Emissions From Marine Spark-Ignition Engines
Control of Air Pollution From Locomotives and Locomotive Engines
Determining Conformity of Federal Actions to State or Federal Implementation Plans
Control of Emissions From Marine Compression-Ignition Engines
Mandatory Patent Licenses
NOx Budget Trading Program and CAIR NOx And SO2 Trading Programs for State Implementation Plans
Federal NOx Budget Trading Program and CAIR NOx and SO2 Trading Programs
Subchapter D - Water Programs (Parts 100 - 149)
Clean Water Act
Public Hearings on Effluent Standards for Toxic Pollutants
Recognition Awards Under the Clean Water Act
Employee Protection Hearings
Criteria for State, Local and Regional Oil Removal Contingency Plans
Discharge of Oil
Oil Pollution Prevention
Liability Limits for Small Onshore Storage Facilities
Designation of Hazardous Substances
Determination of Reportable Quantities For Hazardous Substances
State Certification of Activities Requiring a Federal License or Permit
EPA-Administered Permit Programs: The National Pollutant Discharge Elimination System
State Program Requirements
Procedures for Decisionmaking
Criteria and Standards for the National Pollutant Discharge Elimination System
Toxic Pollutant Effluent Standards
Water Quality Planning and Management
Water Quality Standards
Water Quality Guidance for the Great Lakes System
Secondary Treatment Regulation
Prior Notice of Citizen Suits
Guidelines Establishing Test Procedures for the Analysis of Pollutants
Marine Sanitation Device Standard
Safe Drinking Water Act
National Primary Drinking Water Regulations
National Primary Drinking Water Regulations Implementation
National Secondary Drinking Water Regulations
Underground Injection Control (UIC) Program
State UIC Program Requirements
Underground Injection Control Program: Criteria and Standards
State Underground Injection Control Programs
Hazardous Waste Injection Restrictions
Sole Source Aquifers
Standards on the Maximum Contaminant Level of drinking water (microorganisms, viruses, turbidity, inorganic chemicals, organic chemicals, disinfectants and disinfection byproducts, radionuclides )
Subchapter E - Pesticide Programs (Parts 150 - 180)
Worker protection standards and enforcement by the Occupational Safety and Health Administration
Tolerances and exemptions from tolerances for pesticide chemicals in food
Pesticide Registration and Classification Procedures 
Pesticides classified for restricted use
Standards for certification of commercial and private applicators
Subchapter F - Radiation Protection Programs (Parts 190 - 197)
Environmental radiation protection standards for nuclear power operations
Management and disposal of spent nuclear fuel, high-level and transuranic radioactive wastes
Protection standards for uranium and thorium mill tailings
Radon programs
Subchapter G - Noise Abatement Programs (Parts 201 - 211)
Noise emission standards for transportation equipment
Product noise labeling
Subchapter H - Ocean Dumping (Parts 220 - 238) based on the Ocean Dumping Ban Act
ocean dumping, dredge and fill permit application process
Subchapter I - Solid Wastes (Parts 239 - 282) based on the Resource Conservation and Recovery Act (RCRA)
Guidelines for the thermal processing (incineration) of solid wastes
Guidelines for the storage and collection of residential, commercial, and institutional solid waste
 Criteria for classification of solid waste disposal facilities and practices
Criteria for municipal solid waste landfills
Identification and listing of hazardous waste
Technical standards and corrective action requirements for owners and operators of underground storage tanks (UST)
Subchapter J - Superfund (Parts 300 - 374) based on the Emergency Planning and Community Right-to-Know Act (EPCRA)
Hazardous substances designation, reportable quantities, and notification
Hazardous chemical reporting: Community right-to-know
Toxic chemical release reporting: Community right-to-know
Subchapter N - Effluent Guidelines and Standards (Parts 400 - 471)  (Clean Water Act)
General pretreatment regulations for existing and new sources of pollution
Point source categories:
Dairy products processing
Grain mills
Canned and preserved fruits and vegetables processing
Canned and preserved seafood processing
Sugar processing
Textile mills
Cement manufacturing
Concentrated animal feeding operations (CAFO)
Electroplating
Organic chemicals, plastics, and synthetic fibers (OCPSF)
Inorganic chemicals manufacturing
Soap and detergent manufacturing
Fertilizer manufacturing
Petroleum refining
Iron and steel manufacturing
Nonferrous metals manufacturing (smelters)
Phosphate manufacturing
Steam electric power generating
Ferroalloy manufacturing
Leather tanning and finishing
Glass manufacturing
Asbestos manufacturing
Rubber manufacturing
Timber products processing
Pulp, paper, and paperboard
Meat and poultry products
Metal finishing
Coal mining
Oil and gas extraction
Minerals mining and processing
Centralized waste treatment
Metal products and machinery
Pharmaceutical manufacturing
Ore mining and dressing (Hard rock mining)
Dental offices
Transportation equipment cleaning
Paving and roofing materials (Tars and asphalt)
Waste combustors
Landfills
Paint formulating
Ink formulating
Airport deicing
Construction and development
Concentrated aquatic animal production (Aquaculture)
Gum and wood chemicals manufacturing
Pesticide chemicals
Explosives manufacturing
Carbon black manufacturing
Photographic processing
Hospitals
Battery manufacturing
Plastics molding and forming
Metal molding and Casting (Foundries)
Coil coating
Porcelain enameling
Aluminum forming
Copper forming
Electrical and electronic components
Nonferrous metals forming and metal powders
Subchapter O - Sewage Sludge (Parts 501 - 503)  (Clean Water Act)
Subchapter Q - Energy Policy (Parts 600 - 610)
Subchapter R - Toxic Substances Control Act (TSCA) (Parts 700 - 799)
Subchapter U - Air Pollution Controls (Parts 1039 - 1068)
Clean Air Act (1970)
Clean Air Act (1990)

Chapter IV - Environmental Protection Agency and Department of Justice
(Part 1400)

Chapter V - Council on Environmental Quality
National Environmental Policy Act implementing regulations (Parts 1500 to 1509)
(Parts 1510 - 1518)

Chapter VI -- Chemical Safety and Hazard Investigation Board
(Parts 1600-1620)

Chapter VII -- Environmental Protection Agency and Department of Defense; Uniform National Discharge Standards for Vessels of the Armed Forces
(Part 1700)

References

 40
United States Environmental Protection Agency
Environmental law in the United States